Nassarius livescens is a species of sea snail, a marine gastropod mollusk in the family Nassariidae, the Nassa mud snails or dog whelks.

Description
The length of the shell varies between 16 mm and 30 mm.

Distribution
This species occurs in the Indian Ocean off Madagascar and the Mascarene Basin; in the Pacific Ocean off Japan and Indonesia.

References

 Dautzenberg, Ph. (1929). Contribution à l'étude de la faune de Madagascar: Mollusca marina testacea. Faune des colonies françaises, III(fasc. 4). Société d'Editions géographiques, maritimes et coloniales: Paris. 321–636, plates IV-VII pp.
 Cernohorsky W. O. (1984). Systematics of the family Nassariidae (Mollusca: Gastropoda). Bulletin of the Auckland Institute and Museum 14: 1–356

External links
 

Nassariidae
Gastropods described in 1848
Taxa named by Rodolfo Amando Philippi